Peter Hickmott (21 February 1954 – 22 August 2015) was an Australian rules footballer who played with Essendon and Footscray in the Victorian Football League (VFL).

Notes

External links 		
		

		
		

1954 births
2015 deaths		
Australian rules footballers from Victoria (Australia)		
Essendon Football Club players
Western Bulldogs players
Horsham Football Club players